Angélica María Vázquez Godoy (born 14 December 1990) is a Paraguayan footballer who plays as a midfielder for Libertad/Limpeño. She has been a member of the Paraguay women's national team.

International career
Vázquez played for Paraguay at senior level in two Copa América Femenina editions (2010 and 2014).

International goals
Scores and results list Paraguay's goal tally first

References

1990 births
Living people
Women's association football midfielders
Paraguayan women's footballers
Paraguay women's international footballers
Cerro Porteño players